HPT may refer to:

 Hazard Perception Test, a component of the United Kingdom driving test
 Hazleton Public Transit, in Pennsylvania, United States
 Health Policy and Technology, a scholarly journal
 Heartland Park Topeka, in Kansas, United States
 Heartland Poker Tour
 Hexapod-Telescope
 High-performance teams
 High phosphorus and titanium
 High Point station, in North Carolina, United States
 Histidine phosphotransferase
 Home pregnancy test
 Hopton Heath railway station, in England
 Hosapete Junction railway station, in Karnataka, India
 Human performance technology
 Hyde Park Theatre
 Hypertension
 Hyperparathyroidism
 Hypothalamic–pituitary–thyroid axis
 Hrvatska pošta i telekomunikacije, now T-Hrvatski Telekom
 Hijueputa, Contraction of the Latin word referring to an individual outside the issuer is a descendant of a prostitute